Small Batch is a 2013 EP by Australian indie pop band the Cannanes.

Track listing
Bumper
Crawler
Basics
Molecule
Tiny Compartment
Zone

References

2013 EPs
The Cannanes albums